John "Jack" Kent Trammell (born January 23, 1964) is a college professor and was the Democratic candidate in the 2014 general election for Virginia's 7th congressional district in the United States House of Representatives, which was held on November 4, 2014. Trammell  faced Dave Brat, who defeated incumbent Eric Cantor in the Republican primary; and Libertarian nominee James Carr. Both Trammell and Brat are professors at Randolph–Macon College.

Early life and education 
Trammell was born in Berea, Kentucky, in the infirmary on campus at Berea College where his parents were attending as an undergraduate married couple. He spent time as a child in Kentucky, and then New York City when his father was at Columbia University, and as an adult moved to central Virginia.

His family ancestry dates back to the American colonial period, when Thomas Trammell immigrated to Virginia in 1671, arriving at the port of Alexandria as an indentured servant.

Trammell was a political science undergraduate at Grove City College, where he earned his B.A. He then received advanced degrees or certificates in education, special education, history education, and research methodology, including Master's and PhD degrees from Virginia Commonwealth University, also taking classes through the University of Virginia.

Professional career 
Trammell has worked in the procurement area in state government, and as a special education and history teacher in central Virginia's public schools. He currently works at Randolph–Macon College as the Director of Disability Support Services and as an associate professor of Sociology.

Trammell has authored over 20 books, including works of nonfiction, fiction, and children's literature. He writes in many diverse areas ranging from education to history, and has written a number of columns on the American Civil War for The Washington Times. His latest book, The Richmond Slave Trade: The Economic Backbone of The Old Dominion, was published in 2012. He is currently the president of the Blue Ridge chapter of the Virginia Writers Club.

Trammell has focused his professional career on helping people cope with disabilities.

Politics

1980s and 1990s 
Trammell's involvement with the Democratic Party began at Grove City College. He worked for the Michael Dukakis presidential campaign in 1988 and on Bill Clinton's 1992 and 1996 presidential campaigns in Kentucky, where he also wrote local position papers and statewide editorials.

2014 midterms elections 

Trammell ran for Congress in 2014, to represent the Virginia 7th Congressional district, which is in the Richmond, Virginia, area of the state, facing Dave Brat. He was selected during the weekend of June 7–8, several days before the Republican primary, during a conference call among Democrats of the district. According to Trammell's website, his platform focuses on the need for educational reform, including special education and greater access to college, student loan relief, job creation, accountability in massive public private projects like the expansion of U.S. Route 460, and basic healthcare for every American.

Trammell was defeated by Brat, with James Carr finishing third.

Personal 
Trammell and his wife Audrie reside on a farm in Louisa County near Mineral, Virginia, with several horses, sheep, and other animals. Jack has three grown children, while Audrie has four.

Books 
 Return to Treasure Island (2000) 
 Math in History (2001) 
 Conversations in History - Historical Events & the People Who Starred in Them (coauthored with Joe Gorman) (2005) 
 The Postsecondary Student Survey of Disability-Related Stigma: Development of a Disability Stigma Measurement (2009) 
 Down on the Chickahominy: The Life and Times of a Vanishing Virginia River (2009) 
 Appalachian Dreams (2011) 
 The Richmond Slave Trade: The Economic Backbone of The Old Dominion (2012) 
 The Fourth Branch of Government: We the People with Guy Terrell (2016)

References

External links 
 

Living people
American political scientists
Grove City College alumni
People from Berea, Kentucky
Randolph–Macon College faculty
Virginia Commonwealth University alumni
Virginia Democrats
1964 births
People from Louisa County, Virginia